Pakistan hosts five deserts which were historically forests. They include the Thar Desert in Sindh, the Cholistan Desert in Bahawalpur (Punjab), the Thal Desert in Bhakkar (Punjab), the Kharan Desert in Balochistan, and the Katpana Desert in Skardu (Gilgit-Baltistan).

Coastal desert

Thar Desert 

The Thar Desert spans an area of 175,000 square kilometers and covers large areas of Pakistan and India. It is the largest desert of Pakistan and the only subtropical desert of Asia. It is the 16th largest desert on the planet and the third largest in Asia. It has also spread into India. The Thar Desert, also known as the Great Indian Desert, is a large, arid region in the northwestern part of the Indian subcontinent that forms a natural boundary between India and Pakistan. It is the world's 16th largest desert, and the world's 9th largest subtropical desert. 85% of the Thar Desert is in India, and the remaining 15% is in Pakistan. In India, it covers 320,000 km2 (120,000 sq mi), of which 90% is in Rajasthan and extends into Gujarat, Punjab, and Haryana. In Pakistan, it spreads over Punjab and Sindh starting from Tharparkar District in the east. This desert consists of a very dry part, the Marusthali region, in the west, and a semi-desert region in the east with fewer sand dunes and slightly more precipitation.

Deserts of Pakistan

Hot and dry deserts

Cholistan Desert 

The Cholistan Desert is locally known as "Rohi 'and covers the area of Bahawalpur, Punjab. It adjoins the Thar Desert, extending over to Sindh and into India. Cholistan desert hosts an annual Jeep rally, known as Cholistan Desert Jeep Rally which is the biggest

Thal Desert 

The Thal Desert is located in Bhakkar District of Pakistan between the Indus and Jhelum rivers. A large canal-building project is currently underway to irrigate the land. Irrigation will make most of the desert suitable for farming. In the north of the Thal Desert there are salt ranges, in the east the Jhelum and Chenab rivers and to the west the Indus River.

Sandy desert

Kharan Desert 

The Kharan Desert is a sandy and mountainous desert situated in Balochistan Province in south-western Pakistan.

This desert was the site of Pakistan's second nuclear test, Chagai-II, which was carried out on 30 May 1998.

Cold desert

Katpana Desert 

The Cold Desert is a high-altitude desert located near Skardu, in Pakistan's northern Gilgit-Baltistan region. The desert contains expanses of large sand dunes that are sometimes covered in snow during winter. Situated at an elevation of 2,226 metres (7,303 feet) above sea level, the Katpana Desert is one of the highest deserts in the world.

The desert technically stretches from the Khaplu Valley to Nubra in Ladakh, but the largest desert area is found in Skardu and Shigar Valley. The portion most visited is located near Skardu Airport.

See also
Ecoregions of Pakistan
Forestry in Pakistan
Geography of Pakistan
Tourism in Pakistan
Wildlife of Pakistan

References

External links

 Deserts of Pakistan by 
 PakistanPaedia - Deserts of Pakistan
 Hunza Tour Packages

Des
 
Pakistan